Curzon Street is located within the Mayfair district of London. It is within the City of Westminster, running approximately east to west from Fitzmaurice Place past Shepherd Market to Park Lane.

The street is thought to be named after George Howe, 3rd Viscount Howe from the House of Curzon. Before this time, it was called Mayfair Row.

Other places named after the Curzon family include Curzon Avenue, a street in Northwich, in North west England. In the world of athletics, Curzon Ashton F.C. is a soccer club situated in Ashton-Under-Lyne, which traces its history to the family's name owing to a few members of the family who participated in football. The key parks bearing the Curzon family name include Roker Curzon Park (Sunderland), Curzon Park (in Chester), and Curzon Park Abbey (a monastery of nuns).

History
Curzon Street has been home to various notable members of the peerage. In 1748, a house was built in the street for the 4th Earl of Chesterfield, called Chesterfield House. The house was demolished in 1937, and the site redeveloped as an apartment block. Adjacent to Chesterfield House were smaller dwellings that have served as the London residences for a number of members of the peerage, including Lord Hothfield, the Duke of Grafton, the Earl Verney, Lord Leconfield, Lady Blessington, Alfred de Rothschild, Lord Blythswood and the Earl of Inchcape. Also to the east is Crewe House, formerly known as Wharncliffe House, rebuilt in 1750 and named after the Countess of Wharncliffe in the late 19th century. It is now the Saudi Arabian Embassy.

On the opposite side of the street, until 1894, stood Curzon Chapel (formerly Mayfair Chapel), first erected in 1730. Near to this was the smaller Keith's Chapel, the location before the Marriage Act 1753 of various clandestine marriages, including the marriages of the Duke of Chandos and Mrs Anne Jeffrey in 1744, Lord Strange and Mrs Lucy Smith in 1746, Lord Kensington and Rachel Hill in 1749, Sewellis Shirley and Margaret Rolle, widow of the second Earl of Orford in 1751, the Duke of Hamilton and Miss Gunning in 1752, and of Lord George Bentinck and Mary Davies in 1753.

Other inhabitants of Curzon Street have included the art collector Edward Solly (at no. 7, 1821–44), Benjamin Disraeli until his death in 1881, Lord Macartney until his death in 1806, Member of Parliament George Selwyn in 1776, Prince Pierre Soltykoff and Earl Percy.

Leconfield House, at the corner of South Audley Street with an address on Curzon Street, became the home of the UK security service (known as MI5) in 1945, and remained so until 1976. In May 2020, Robert Tchenguiz submitted plans to Westminster City Council to convert the building into a 65-bedroom private members' hotel. Tchenguiz had bought the building for his Rotch property business in 2004 for about £140 million.

Various activities were also conducted by MI5 at addresses on South Audley Street. In 1978, MI5 also occupied facilities at 1-4 Curzon Street, known as "Curzon Street House", for use by the registry, administration and technical services departments; that site was redeveloped in 1996.

In Chesterfield Gardens, which is a cul-de-sac off Curzon Street, the second home office of the two offshore commercial stations known as Radio Caroline was established during 1964; later that year the sales office of Radio London was opened at number 17 Curzon Street, to be followed across the street at number 32 by the establishment of offices serving Radio England and Britain Radio. The introduction of the Marine Offences Act, which became law after midnight on 14 August 1967, forced the closure of all of these offices.

In the 1970s, American songwriter Harry Nilsson owned a two-bedroomed apartment (number 12) at 9 Curzon Place (now Curzon Square). Both Cass Elliot of the Mamas & the Papas and Keith Moon of the Who died in the flat within four years of each other, each aged 32.

1 Curzon Street is a modern office building. The fifth floor was home to AIG Financial Products, the division that "nearly destroyed" the US insurance company and has been described by reporter Peter Koenig as the "epicenter" of the global financial crisis of 2008.

G. Heywood Hill Ltd, mentioned by Nancy Mitford in her letters, most particularly in those compiled for the book The Bookshop at 10 Curzon Street: Letters between Nancy Mitford and Heywood Hill 1952–73, remains open for trading.

In literature
Oscar Wilde mentions the street in four of his works. In The Picture of Dorian Gray, Lord Henry Wotton lives on Curzon Street; in Lady Windermere's Fan, the notorious Mrs. Erlynne lives at 84A Curzon Street; in "Lord Arthur Savile's Crime", Lady Clementine Beauchamp lives on Curzon Street; and in An Ideal Husband, Lord Goring lives on Curzon Street.
In the Sherlock Holmes story "The Adventure of Shoscombe Old Place", Holmes' friend Dr. Watson mentions Curzon Street as the location of the moneylender Sam Brewer.
Roald Dahl's character Henry Sugar lives on Curzon Street, and causes a disturbance by throwing large amounts of money down into the street from his balcony.
In Vanity Fair by William Makepeace Thackeray, Rawdon and Rebecca Crawley live in a very small comfortable house in Curzon Street. 
In "Mrs. Packletide's Tiger" by Saki, the wealthy Mrs. Packletide has a house on Curzon Street. 
The street is the location of the Junior Ganymede Club in P. G. Wodehouse's Jeeves and Wooster series of books (notably The Code of the Woosters).
In Orlando: A Biography by Virginia Woolf, Orlando has a house on Curzon Street in the late 19th century.
In The Mystery of the Blue Train by Agatha Christie, Ruth and Derek Kettering live on Curzon Street. 
In Katherine Mansfield's short story "A Cup of Tea", Curzon Street is mentioned.
In Tinker Tailor Soldier Spy by John Le Carré, Curzon Street is the location of Heywood Hill's bookshop where George Smiley buys and sells rare books.
In Dennis Wheatley's Duke de Richleau series, the Duke has a flat on Curzon Street.
Curzon Street is mentioned in Van Morrison's song "He Ain't Give You None".
In Tiny Carteret (1930) by H. C. McNeile, the eponymous character lives in a service flat on Curzon Street.
in Long Lost (2009) by Harlan Coben, Lock-Horne Investments (Company owned by one of the characters Windsor "Win" Horne Lockwood III) has offices on Curzon Street.
 In Penny Vincenzi's trilogy The Spoils of Time, the fictional Earl and Countess of Beckingham own a house on Curzon Street.
 In Cassandra Clare’s The Last Hours trilogy, main character James Herondale resides on Curzon Street with wife Cordelia Carstairs.

References

External links

 

Mayfair
Streets in the City of Westminster